The Excommunication of Robert the Pious is a 1875 painting by Jean-Paul Laurens, held by the Musée d'Orsay. It depicts the excommunication of Robert II of France in the year 998.

History
The painting was exhibited at the Salon of 1875 and, together with Laurens' other work on display that year, L'Interdit, was generally reckoned to be the finest historical paintings entered. It was bought from the artist by the State in 1875, and exhibited at the Luxembourg Museum until 1929, when it was transferred to the Louvre. It has belonged to the collections of the Musée d'Orsay since 1982.

The work was Laurens' first after his visit to Italy, which influenced his technique. His use of colour in this painting is noticeably less sober and more animated than in his previous work. It was one of a series of historical paintings by Laurens that depicted various parts of the narrative of Robert the Pious. These were L'Interdit (1875), showing France being placed under interdict for his refusal to end his relationship with his wife Bertha, and Répudiation de la reine Berthe (1883), showing their eventual parting.

Interpretation
The painting depicts the moment after the excommunication of Robert II by Pope Gregory V for refusing to repudiate his second wife, Berthe. Robert was both her second cousin and godfather to her son.

As the representatives of the papacy leave the throne room, Robert and Bertha stare into space, in the grip of their dilemma. The royal scepter lies on the ground, and the candle which has been blown out and placed on the ground, as provided for in the ritual of excommunication, is still smoking. The austere decor of the room offers little to distract the viewer from the faces of the two protagonists as they stare with foreboding at the smoking candle before them. They are completely alone, the entire court having abandoned them. Their expressions give an indication of the terrifying scene they have just witnessed. Jules Claretie described it as exactly like a theatrical scene, and the work as not so much a painting as a moment before the curtain falls.

Selected exhibitions
The painting has been exhibited internationally many times, including notably:

Salon - palais des Champs Elysées - France, Paris, 1875
Exposition Universelle - palais du Trocadéro - France, Paris, 1878Gustave Geffroy et l'art moderne - Bibliothèque nationale de France - Paris, 1957Europa 1900. Schilderijen, Tekeningen, Beelhouwkunst, Juwelen - Museum voor Schone Kunsten -  Ostend, 1967Le Salon Imaginaire - Bilder aus den grossen kunstauss tel hunger der zweiten Hälfte des XIX Jahrhunderts - Kunstverein - Berlin, 1968
Modern Japanese Art and Paris - National Museum of Modern Art - Tokyo, 1973
From Courbet to Cézanne, a new 19th century - Preview of the Musée d'Orsay, Paris - Brooklyn Museum - New York, 1986Jean-Paul Laurens, 1838-1921 : Peintre d'histoire - musée d'Orsay, Paris, 1997-1998De tijd van Degas - Gemeentemuseum - The Hague, 2002Dalla scena al dipinto. La magia del teatro nella pittura dell'Ottocento. Da David a Delacroix da Füssli a Degas - Museo d'Arte Moderna e Contemporanea di Trento e Rovereto - Rovereto, 2010Drama and Desire: Artists and the Theatre - Art Gallery of Ontario - Toronto, 2010El canto del cisne. Pinturas académicas del Salón de Paris. Colecciones Musée d'Orsay - Fundación Mapfre - Madrid, 2015Gut · Wahr · Schön. Meisterwerke des Pariser Salons aus dem Musée d'Orsay'' - :de:Kunsthalle der Hypo-Kulturstiftung- Munich, 2017-2018

References

1875 paintings
Paintings in the collection of the Musée d'Orsay
French paintings
History paintings
Paintings of couples